Hoslemo is a village in Bykle municipality in Agder county, Norway. The village is located in the Setesdalen valley, along the river Otra and the Norwegian National Road 9. The mountains Kvervetjønnuten and Snjoheinuten lie to the west of the village.

The small village grew up around two farms that have been in use since before the year , possibly back to the Viking Age. The village gained many new homesteads during the 20th century and by 1988, there were at least 18 farms and residences in the small village.

References

Villages in Agder
Bykle